Geraldo Cardoso Décourt (14 February 1911 – 27 May 1998) was a Brazilian actor and painter.

Early life

Décourt was born on 14 February 1911.

Career

In 1929, Décourt invented button football. He is regarded to be one of the first abstractionist painters in Brazil.

References

External links
 

1911 births
1998 deaths
Brazilian actors
Brazilian painters